Joseph Hepworth (1834–1911) was the clothing manufacturer who founded Joseph Hepworth & Son, a company which grew to become the United Kingdom's largest clothing manufacturer and which is now known as Next plc.

Career
Born at Lindley in Huddersfield, Joseph Hepworth left school at ten to join George Walker's Mill in Leeds in 1844.

In 1864 Joseph Hepworth went into business with James Rhodes, his wife's brother, as a tailor in Leeds. By 1881 their factory in Wellington Street employed 500 people and, unusually, made all three pieces of a gentlemen's three-piece suit. In the 1880s they innovated further establishing shops to sell their suits direct to the public. By 1890 they employed 2,000 operatives who sold their stock through 107 shops.

Joseph Hepworth died in Harrogate in 1911 and within 6 years of his death Joseph Hepworth & Son was the largest clothing manufacturer in the United Kingdom.

Family
Hepworth married Sarah Rhodes in 1855 they went on to have three sons and four daughters.

References

1834 births
1911 deaths
British retail company founders
English businesspeople in fashion
English businesspeople in retailing
19th-century English businesspeople
People from Huddersfield
English Methodists
Businesspeople from Yorkshire
British tailors